The Saxetbach is a mountain river south of Interlaken in the Canton of Bern, Switzerland. It is a left tributary of the river Lütschine. It flows through the village Saxeten and joins the Lütschine in Wilderswil. It forms a narrow ravine, the Saxetbach Gorge.

1999 accident

On 27 July 1999, an accident occurred in Saxetbach Gorge (a gorge close to the village of Saxeten) in which 21 young people from Australia, New Zealand, England, South Africa, and Switzerland died.

Forty-eight people from two coach tour parties had elected an optional side event of canyoning. It was organized by Adventure World, a now defunct company located in Wilderswil, not far from Saxeten. At , flash floods began pouring through the gorge and 21 people within the group were swept to their deaths; 18 were tourists and three were canyon guides.  By 7 pm, the stories had hit the world news, and the hotels they were staying in were bombarded with phone calls, but the staff knew only what they saw on television.

The survivors were rescued and then questioned by Swiss Police before being released and returned to their hotel at  the next morning. Until then they had no idea how many people had died nor the enormity of the disaster.

Identifying the dead bodies was a serious problem for the Swiss authorities as the bodies were badly traumatized.  Eleven survivors agreed to go to the mortuary to identify the dead, but many victims had to be identified through DNA and dental analysis. Families were desperate to see for themselves what had happened, and Swissair along with Swiss medical services provided meet and greet sessions for families, and also much counseling for those who had been present. Bodies of the dead washed up in Lake Brienz, a popular boating lake, during peak summer tourist season. The bodies were mostly pulled out of the lake by young Dutch tourists who stayed at the nearby campsite. This particular group was going to join an Adventure World rafting or canyoning trip this same day, but decided not to go at the last moment. 

Since the incident, the press reported many rumors about what happened.  Emergency services claim they sent someone to tell the group of the impending storms, and families of the dead claim that the company should have seen the signs of the weather.  Swiss authorities were quick to blame profit-seeking and general negligence as the cause of the accident.

After the disaster, Adventure World went out of business.  Their former premises, near the Wilderswil Station, are now occupied by a bank. In 2001, some of the staff at Adventure World were charged in connection with the deaths. A total of six staff members were found guilty of manslaughter through culpable negligence and given suspended sentences of between two and five months and fined between 4,000 and 7,500 CHF.

References

External links
 A storm in the distance an Outside Magazine article about the canyoning accident.

Canyons and gorges of Switzerland
1999 floods in Europe
1999 in Switzerland
Floods in Switzerland
Landforms of the canton of Bern
1999 disasters in Switzerland